The following is a list of releases by Finger Eleven.

Albums

Studio albums

ALetters from Chutney was released under Finger Eleven's original name, Rainbow Butt Monkeys.

Live albums

Compilation albums

Extended plays

Songs

Singles

Notes
 All Canadian chart positions from June 16, 2007 and onward are from the Canadian Hot 100. All positions before that date are from Canadian Singles Chart.

Compilation appearances

Videos

Video albums

Music videos

In popular culture

Video games
"Good Times", "Other Light" and "Conversations" were featured in the GameCube game 1080° Avalanche.
"Good Times" was on the soundtrack of SSX 3.
"Stay in Shadow" was on the soundtrack of Burnout 3: Takedown.
"Paralyzer" is a playable song in Rock Revolution (including the DS version), plus Guitar Hero: Modern Hits for DS, Band Hero, and Rock Band via the Rock Band Network.

Film and television
In 2002, the band recorded the song "Slow Chemical" for wrestler Kane. "One Thing" has been used several times by World Wrestling Entertainment on several shows and DVDs.
Several of the band's songs have featured on the soundtracks to Marvel films. "Slow Chemical" appeared on the soundtrack to The Punisher, "Sad Exchange" was on 2003's Daredevil soundtrack and an Elektra mix of "Thousand Mile Wish" was featured in the credits of the 2005 movie Elektra.
"First Time", "Stay and Drown", and "Drag You Down" were all featured in the Dragon Ball Z Movies Lord Slug and Cooler's Revenge.
"One Thing" was featured in the Scrubs episode "My Fault", as well as in episodes of Smallville and Third Watch. The short-lived TV series Life As We Know It featured "One Thing" at the end of the sixth episode, "Natural Disasters". The song was also featured in the short-lived science fiction series Jake 2.0, at the end of episode 10, "The Spy Who Really Liked Me".
"Drag You Down" was featured in an episode of the television series John Doe.
"Paralyzer" was featured in the 16th episode of the first season of Gossip Girl titled "All About My Brother".
"Paralyzer" also featured in the pilot episode of Greek playing in the background at the Kappa Tau rush party.
"Suffocate" appeared on the Scream 3 soundtrack.
"Stay in Shadow" appeared on the soundtrack of the 2003 remake of The Texas Chainsaw Massacre, wrongly listed as "Stand in Shadow". Additionally, it is listed as track number 16, but it is actually the 15th track on the album.
"Complicated Questions" appeared in the 16th episode of the second season of CSI: Miami titled "Invasion", playing distinctly in the background of the surfboard shop when a suspect was being questioned.
Finger Eleven guest starred in episode 26 of the 11th season of MTV's MADE.  The episode also featured the song "Change the World" as well as "One Thing" and "Paralyzer."
"Living in a Dream" was named the official theme song to the 2011 WWE Royal Rumble.

Other
"Paralyzer" is featured in the rollercoaster "Hollywood Rip Ride Rockit" at Universal Studios Florida.

References

 
 
Discographies of Canadian artists
Rock music group discographies